Calafate is a Belo Horizonte Metro station on Line 1. It was opened on 1 August 1986 as part of the inaugural section of the line, from Eldorado to Lagoinha. The station is located between Gameleira and Carlos Prates.

References

Belo Horizonte Metro stations
1986 establishments in Brazil
Railway stations opened in 1986